Haunted Studio was a Canadian music variety television series which aired on CBC Television in 1954.

Premise
The series was recorded at the same studio as used for The Big Revue, except that it was reduced to a minimalist stage devoid of backdrops or furniture except for a few basic seats or props.

Regular performers included Esther Ghan (vocals), Jerry Hicks (theremin) and a vocal group featuring The Esquires with two female vocalists. Jack Kane led the show's music while Don Gillies served as choreographer.

Scheduling
This half-hour series was broadcast on Thursdays at 10:30 p.m. (Eastern) from 22 July to 2 September 1954. A series pilot was produced in late 1953 featuring Art Hallman (singer), Budd Knapp (actor) and Margo McKinnon (singer).

References

External links
 
 

CBC Television original programming
1950s Canadian music television series
1954 Canadian television series debuts
1954 Canadian television series endings
Black-and-white Canadian television shows